Kevin Watt (born 1 October 1989) is a Scottish professional footballer who plays for Clyde.

Clyde
After a good season in the junior ranks with Bo'ness United, Jim Duffy brought 22-year-old Watt back into senior football with Clyde. Watt made his début for the Bully Wee when they were 2–0 down away at Montrose, but after an improved second half they went on to win the game 3–2. On 16 February 2013, Watt scored against Rangers in a 4–1 defeat at Broadwood.

Watt played for Linlithgow Rose in 2018–2019.

References

External links
 (Airdrie United stats)
 (Clyde stats)

1989 births
Airdrieonians F.C. players
Albion Rovers F.C. players
Association football forwards
Living people
Footballers from Bellshill
Scottish Football League players
Scottish footballers
Bo'ness United F.C. players
Clyde F.C. players
Linlithgow Rose F.C. players
Scottish Professional Football League players